This is a list of Teletubbies episodes and videos.

Series overview

Original series

Revival series

Original series (1997–2001)

Season 1 (1997)

Season 2 (1998)

Season 3 (1999)

Season 4 (2000)

Season 5 (2001)

Revival series (2015–18)

Season 1 (2015)

Season 2 (2016)

Season 3 (2017)

Season 4 (2018)

Home media

VHS
Here Come the Teletubbies (Release Date: 1997 (UK); Release Date: 1 September 1998 (US))
Dance with the Teletubbies (Release Date: 1997 (UK); Release Date: 1 September 1998 (US))
Nursery Rhymes (Release Date: 1998 (UK); Release Date: 9 February 1999 (US))
Favourite Things/Favorite Things (Release Date: 1998 (UK); Release Date: 11 May 1999 (US))
Uh Oh! Messes & Muddles/Funny Day (USA) (Release Date: 1998 (UK); Release Date: 7 September 1999 (US))
Happy Christmas from the Teletubbies (1998)
Big Hug! (Release Date: 1999 (UK); Release Date: 1 February 2000 (US))
Musical Playtime (1999)
Teletubbies and the Snow (1999)
Ready Steady Go! (2000)
Bedtime/Bedtime Stories and Lullabies (2000)
Hands, Feet and Dirty Knees (2000)
Animals Big and Small/Baby Animals (2001)
Busy Day (2001)
Go! & Let's Dance! (2001)
Magical Surprises (2001)
Happy Weather Stories (2002)
Hide and Seek (2002)
What's That? (2002)
Look! (2003)
Oooh! (2003)
Again-Again! (2004)
Naughty Noo-Noo! (2004)

DVD

Digital
  The first ten original episodes from 1997 and the first sixty episodes of the new series have been release on BBC Store.
 In the US, the first 208 episodes of the 1997–2001 series are available on the NOGGIN video service. The first 52 were released on 25 May 2016, the next 52 were released on 4 January 2017, the third 52 were released on 3 May 2017, the fourth 26 were released on 13 September 2017 and the fifth 26 were released on 24 January 2018 with the remaining 157 episodes rolling out in the future.

References

External links 
 

Teletubbies
Teletubbies